Aitoo is a village of the Pälkäne municipality in Pirkanmaa, Finland. At the end of 2020, the village had 2,569 inhabitants.

There is one grocery store and two schools in Aitoo. The village is known for its rock festival called Aitoon Kirkastusjuhlat, which takes place during the summer.

History 
Aitoo has existed at least since 1890. Originally Aitoo was not an official village or farm name, but a term referring to the larger community formed by the villages of Kajantila, Miemala and Kouvala.

It was originally a part of the Luopioinen municipality, which was consolidated with Pälkäne in 2007.

Name 
According to Martti Rapola, the name of the village is related to the word aita, "fence". One of his theories is that Aitoo means "villages by the same fence", with the villages in question being Kajantila, Miemala and Kouvala. According to his other theory, the name is derived from the dialectal word aitoo, a Tavastian term meaning "area enclosed with a fence" (standard Finnish aitaus).

References

External links

 Aitoo's location at Fonecta

Pälkäne
Villages in Finland